Ornithuroscincus bengaun is a species of skink endemic to Milne Bay Province, Papua New Guinea. It is only known from its type locality in the Owen Stanley Range.

The holotype, an adult male, measures  in snout–vent length. No other specimens are known.

References

Ornithuroscincus
Skinks of New Guinea
Reptiles of Papua New Guinea
Endemic fauna of New Guinea
Endemic fauna of Papua New Guinea
Taxa named by Allen Allison
Taxa named by Salvador Carranza
Taxa named by Edward Frederick Kraus
Reptiles described in 2021